Theodoxus danubialis is a species of small freshwater snail with an operculum,  an aquatic gastropod mollusk in the family Neritidae, the nerites. The species is considered as endangered in Germany, Austria and in the Czech Republic.

Etymology
The Latin name Theodoxus danubialis means "God's gift to the Danube" or "The praise of God in the Danube".

Subspecies
Theodoxus danubialis cantianus (Kennard & Woodward, 1924) † 
Theodoxus danubialis danubialis (C. Pfeiffer, 1828) 
Theodoxus danubialis stragulatus (C. Pfeiffer, 1828)

Description
These shells are quite  flattened, with 3-3.5 whorls. The surface has a characteristic dark brown zigzag drawing on a light background. The width of the zigzag lines is variable. The mouth is round to slightly elliptical. The operculum is pale yellow. The edge is brown and slightly thickened. The body of the snail is bright with a wide base. The antennae are long and pointed.

Distribution 
The distribution of this species is Mediterranean and Pontic. It occurs in Austria, Bosnia and Herzegovina, Bulgaria, Croatia, Czech Republic (in Moravia it is critically endangered), Germany (in Bavaria only and it is critically endangered), Hungary, Italy, Romania, Slovakia, Slovenia, Ukraine, Serbia and Montenegro.

Habitat
This species needs clean, oxygen-rich rivers. These snails live on hard  benthic substrates, typically rocks or stony ground and feed mainly on diatoms.

Bibliography
 Peter Glöer: Die Tierwelt Deutschlands. Mollusca I Süßwassergastropoden Nord- und Mitteleuropas Bestimmungsschlüssel, Lebensweise, Verbreitung. 2. neubearb. Aufl., 327 S., ConchBooks, Hackenheim 2002 
 Rosina Fechter und Gerhard Falkner: Weichtiere. 287 S., Mosaik-Verlag, München 1990 (Steinbachs Naturführer 10) 
 Jürgen H. Jungbluth und Dietrich von Knore: Trivialnamen der Land- und Süßwassermollusken Deutschlands (Gastropoda et Bivalvia). Mollusca, 26(1): 105-156, Dresden 2008

References

External links
 

Neritidae
Gastropods described in 1828